The Kitchen rudder is the familiar name for "Kitchen's Patent Reversing Rudders", a combination rudder and directional propulsion delivery system for relatively slow speed displacement boats which was invented in the early 20th century by John G. A. Kitchen of Lancashire, England.  It turns the rudder into a directional thruster, and allows the engine to maintain constant revolutions and direction of drive shaft rotation while altering thrust by use of a control which directs thrust forward or aft.  Only the rudder pivots; the propeller itself is on a fixed shaft and does not.

"Kitchener gear" or "Kitchener rudder" have been common misnomers for the Kitchen rudder.

It is held under British Provisional Patent No. 3249/1914 and US Patent No. 1186210 (1916) and has been improved with the design in US Patent 4895093 (1990).

Description 
The rudder consists of a pair of slightly conical (usually but not always - designs vary), semi-cones mounted on a pivot either side of the propeller with the long axis of the cone running fore and aft when the helm is midships.  They are pivoted about a vertical axis such that the cone may close off the propeller thrust aft of the propeller, directing the thrust forwards and thus creating motion astern.

In addition to the "jaws" of the cone being controlled the direction of thrust is also controlled by rudder direction. In this way, it is unlike the azimuth thrusters used on many medium and large vessels, or the outboard motors or stern drives used by some small boats, since these all use the directed thrust to avoid the need of a rudder altogether.

Modern equivalent include certain types of pump jets or Kort nozzle.

While not strictly Kitchen rudder technology, the "bucket" on some aircraft jet engines is an aeronautical derivative of the device.  When the deflectors are deployed, directing thrust forwards, they are equivalent to the Kitchen rudder in the "full astern" position.

Operation
The operation of the Kitchen rudder is performed with the propeller engaged, even when the boat is stationary. The rudder is controlled by a small wheel on the tiller.

Neutral

The engine is brought up to speed with the drive to the propeller engaged and with the Kitchen rudder in the "neutral" position.  This is a position where an equal quantity of thrust is aimed forward and aft.  Each vessel will have a unique "neutral" position.

Moving ahead

The Kitchen gear is opened up to direct an increasing proportion of thrust aft. As the balance changes the vessel will move ahead.

Moving astern

The Kitchen gear is closed to direct an increasing proportion of thrust forward. As the balance changes the vessel will move astern.

See also

Notes

External links
Description near the foot of the article under Pinnace
Kitchen Rudder - Diagrams
Kitchen Rudder - Discussion and diagrams
 Manoeuvring device for boats: United States Patent 4895093, expiring in fall 2007
Special rudders and manoeuvering devices
U.S. patent 1,186,210 
U.S. patent 4,895,093

Propellers
Marine propulsion
Fluid dynamics